The Japanese language has different ways of expressing the possessive relation. There are several "verbal possessive" forms based on verbs with the sense of "to possess" or "to have" or "to own". An alternative is the use of the particle no (の) between two nouns or noun phrases.

Verbal possessives

Shoyuusuru and motsu
Shoyuu (所有) is a Japanese noun of Sino-Japanese origin. It translates as ‘the state of possession’ or ‘ownership’. In Japanese, nouns, mainly those of Chinese origin, may attach themselves to the verb suru (する), ‘to do’, to form a compound verb. The verb ‘to come to possess/own’, shoyuusuru, is formed in this manner.
Shoyuusuru is considered a formal term, used in reference to possessions with legal certification such as cars, in comparison to the native Japanese counterpart motsu (持つ), generally meaning ‘to come to have/own/possess’.
Both motsu and shoyuusuru require animate possessors and controllable alienable possessees. The possessee may be human/animate but must be controllable, for example, a possessee cannot be a father/mother and such. The possessor noun phrase is the subject, as indicated by the particle ga (が), and the possessee noun phrase is the object, which is indicated by the particle o (を).

 ジョンさんが車を所有している　John-san ga kuruma wo shoyuushite iru: "John has a car" (lit. "John car possess be.");
 ジョンさんが犬を飼っている（持っている）　John-san ga inu wo motte iru: "John has a dog" (lit. "John dog hold be.").

Japanese verbs do not recognise the difference between present and future form. There is no verbal conjugation which translates as ‘I will do this.’ The ‘plain’ form of the verbs shoyuusuru and motsu cannot be used to express present states. In order to do this, as seen in (1) and (2), the verb must be changed into its –te form and have the verb ‘to be (animate)’ – iru (いる) attached. This form indicates a continuous state of being – ‘I have, and I continue to have…’

3)所有する　shoyuusuru
所有して　shoyuushi-te
所有している　shyoyuushi-te iru
‘to have/possess/own’

4)持つ　motsu
持って　mot-te
持っている　mot-te iru
'to have/possess/own'

The sentence structure to be used when using shyoyuusuru and motsu to describe possession is

5) NP1           ga                NP2        o             Verb-te iru
Possessor   Subject-marker      Possessee  Object-marker    Verb-te iru

Iru and Aru
Iru (いる) and aru (ある) are the present/future ‘plain’ form of the verb translated as ‘to be/exist’. Iru is always used in reference to an animate subject or object, and aru always refers to an object or subject that is inanimate;

6) jon-san/hon wa 		Osaka ni		i-ru/ar-u
John/book       SUB		Osaka NI		be-PRES
‘John/The book is in Osaka.’

When the verb is used following an object marked with ga and a subject marked with ni (に), the translation becomes ‘to have’. For example,

7) jon-san ni		kuruma ga		ar-u
John	    NI		car       OBJ		have-PRES
‘John has a car’.

To arrive at this translation, the particle ni is read, in this context, as ‘in/at’, the place where something is at the present. So at first, the translation for (7) may be considered ‘a car is at John/in John’s presence’. In order to reach the translation ‘to have’, Tsujioka presents these two examples:

8)*heya ni	otoko ga	ar-u
Room NI	man OBJ	be-PRES
‘There is a man in the room.’

9) jon-san ni	 musuko ga	ar-u
John       NI	   son	  OBJ	be-PRES
‘John has a son’

Sentence (8) is semantically incorrect, as aru is used in reference to an animate object. The use of musuko with aru, however, is allowed, as some kinship terms may use the ‘animacy-insensitive’ form of aru. It can then be said that there are two translations of aru/iru – ‘to be’ and ‘to have’.

Unlike shoyuusuru and motsu however, iru/aru can express relationship as well as ownership, as seen in (9) where John does not physically own his son. Rather, it is a statement expressing the relationship.

Although iru/aru sentences may have a possessee that is alienable and inalienable, it is not possible to have a modified inalienable possessee;

10) *jon-san ni		pinku no kami ga	ar-u
John	     NI		pink  GEN hair  OBJ	be-PRES
‘John has pink hair.’

This appears to be the only restraint, other than the animate/inanimate restrictions, and its solution will be discussed in the next section.
	The sentence structure for iru/aru possessive sentences is

11) NP1		ni		NP2		ga		Verb.
Possessor         NI		Possessee	OBJ		Verb

Suru
As mentioned, the iru/aru form of possessive sentences does not allow for modified possessees. There is however another verbal possessive which does allow for modified possessees, in fact the possessee must be modified and may only be inalienable. This is suru (する). The sentence structure for possessive suru sentences is the same as that of shyoyuusuru/motsu sentences:

12) NP1		ga		NP2		o		shi-te i-ru
Possessor	SUB		Possessee	OBJ		do-PART be-PRES

Suru translates as ‘do’, using the form seen in (12), shi-te iru, translates as ‘doing’. This is constructed in the same manner as shyoyuushi-te iru and mot-te iru;

13)suru
shi-te
shi-te iru
‘is doing’

As with the Shoyuu/motsu sentences, suru possessive sentences only express ownership and not relationships (as the possessee must be inalienable, as aforementioned):

14) jon-san ga		pinku no kami    o		shi-te        i-ru
John      SUBJ	pink    hair  GEN OBJ		do-PART be-PRES
‘John has pink hair.’

Zokusuru
The verb zokusuru （属する）is translated as ‘to belong to’ or ‘to be affiliated with’. The verb does not indicate belonging in the sense of ownership, but rather affiliation. For example, the following is incorrect

15) *kono hon   wa	jon-san   ni		zokushi-te     	i-ru
This book  SUB	John	    NI		belong-PART be-PRES
‘This book belongs to John.’

This sentence is grammatically incorrect. Zokusuru can only be used when describing affiliation, such as in (16):

16) jon-san     wa	ANU   ni	zokushi-te 		i-ru
John	    SUB	ANU   NI	belong-PART	be-PRES
‘John belongs to/is affiliated with the ANU.’

This verb is included in this list in order to describe the difference in translation meanings.

Expressing possession using particle no (の)

Possession and relationships
The particle no (の) is used to express possession, either figuratively or literally, of one noun phrase by a second noun phrase, by indicating that the noun preceding no is the possessor, and the noun following is the possessee. Both the possessor and the possessee can be alienable or inalienable:

(20)watashi no te 
私の手
me NO hand
'My hand.'

21) jon no kuruma　
ジョンの車
John NO car
'John's car.'

In this way, no may modify an unlimited number of nouns, for example

22) watashi no inu no beddo...　
私のいぬのベッド
me NO dog NO bed...
'My dog's bed...'

In the same way, this noun-no-noun structure also indicates relationships between the possessor and uncontrollable possessees. For example,

23)watashi no okasan　
私のお母さん
me NO mother
'My mother.'

24) jon no ani　
ジョンの兄
John NO big brother
'John's big brother'

The possessee can be pronominalised by replacing it with either mono (もの), which translates as ‘one’, as in ‘John’s one’, or Ø (0 particle). Japanese often omits proper nouns and subjects once they have already been mentioned in a conversation, and which are then understood through context. In the following sentences, desu (です) the copula translates as ‘is’,

25)kore    wa  jon no  mono	desu　
これはジョンの物です
this   SUB  John	 NO	one	COP
‘This is John’s one.’

26) kore  wa   jon no  Ø  desu　
これはジョンの～です
this SUB  John        NO Ø  COP
‘This is John’s.’

There is a slight difference in meaning between the two pronouns. As Hirakouji states, mono-pronominalisation refers to the possessee as an objectively viewed object, while Ø-pronominalisation conveys the speaker's subjective attention to the object and inclusive contrast, and cannot appear in the ordinary focus position. Hirakouji presents the following examples (in (28), the first no is used to nominalise the preceding clause) to demonstrate how Ø-pronominalisation cannot be used in the ordinary focus position (27 is incorrect):

27)*kore  wa     merii no   Ø   desu  ga, 	are  wa       jon Ø  desu　
これはメリーの～ですがあれはジョン～です
this  SUB   Mary         NO  Ø   COP  but,	that  SUB    John         Ø  COP
‘This is Mary’s, but that is John’s.’

28)watashi  ga	hoshii 	no 	 wa	   merii  no   Ø	desu　
me         SUB	want  NOM	OBJ	   Mary        NO  Ø	COP
‘What I want is Mary’s.’

The phrase structure when using no as a possessive particle is indicated in (29). The phrase constitutes a noun phrase.

29)([NOUN (possessor)]	no	[NOUN (possessee)])

Footnotes

Bibliography

(2001). Kodansha's furigana: English-Japanese dictionary. Kodansha Ltd.: Japan.

(2001). Kodansha's furigana: Japanese-English dictionary. Kodansha Ltd.: Japan.

Possession (Linguistics). Possession (linguistics)

Baron, Irene (ed.). (et al.). (2001). Dimensions of possession. John Benjamins Publishing Company: United States.

Brown, Lesley. (Ed.). (1993). The new shorter Oxford English dictionary: Volumes I and II. Clarendon Press: Oxford.

Chino, Naoko:
(2001). Japanese verbs at a glance. Kodansha International Ltd.: Japan.
(2005). How to tell difference between Japanese particles: Comparisons and exercises. Kodansha International Ltd.: Japan.

Hirakouji, Kenji. (1979). ‘Ni’ and ‘no’ in Japanese. University of Los Angeles: United States.

Spahn, Mark, and Hadamitzky, Wolfgang. (1998). The learner's kanji dictionary. Charles E. Tuttle Publishing: Singapore.

Tanimori, Masahiro. (2003). Handbook of Japanese grammar. Charles E. Tuttle Publishing: Singapore.

Tsujioka, Takae. (2002). Outstanding dissertations in linguistics: The syntax of possession in Japanese. Routledge: Great Britain.

Japanese grammar